Daniel Bartl (born 5 July 1989) is a Czech football player who currently plays for MFK Karviná.

Honours
Raków Częstochowa
Polish Cup: 2020–21

References

External links
 
 
 Guardian Football

1989 births
Sportspeople from Ostrava
Living people
Czech footballers
Association football defenders
FC Baník Ostrava players
FK Čáslav players
FC Hlučín players
FK Viktoria Žižkov players
FK Mladá Boleslav players
Raków Częstochowa players
FC Slovan Liberec players
MFK Karviná players
Czech First League players
Ekstraklasa players
Czech expatriate footballers
Expatriate footballers in Poland